Frances Dean is the name of:

Frances Drake (1912–2000) née Dean, American actress
FrancEyE (1922–2009) aka Frances Dean Smith, American poet

See also
Frankie Dean (disambiguation)
Frank Dean (disambiguation)